Jowzam is a city in the Central District of Shahr-e Babak County, Kerman Province, Iran.  At the 2006 census, its population was 7,949, in 1,495 families.

References

Populated places in Shahr-e Babak County

Cities in Kerman Province